Gbudwe State was a state of South Sudan that existed between 2 October 2015 and 22 February 2020. It was created from Western Equatoria state. Tambura State was split from Gbudwe State on January 14, 2017. Gbudwe State was located in the Equatoria region. Gbudwe bordered the states of Lol, Maridi, Tambura, and Western Lakes, and also the province of Haut-Uélé in the Democratic Republic of the Congo and Haut-Mbomou in the Central African Republic. The state had a population of 364,272 in 2008.

History
Before the creation of the state, Gbudwe State was part of Western Equatoria. On 2 October 2015, President Salva Kiir issued a decree establishing 28 states in place of the 10 constitutionally established states. The decree established the new states largely along ethnic lines. A number of opposition parties and civil society groups challenged the constitutionality of the decree. Kiir later resolved to take it to parliament for approval as a constitutional amendment. In November the South Sudanese parliament empowered President Kiir to create new states.

Patrick Raphael was appointed Governor on 24 December 2015.

On 22 February 2020, a peace deal ending the South Sudanese Civil War reverted the 28 states back into the original 10 states. Gbudwe State has since been reincorporated into Western Equatoria.

Geography
Gbudwe State is located in the Equatoria region and the state bordered the states of Wau State to the north, Lol State to the northwest, Tonj State to the northeast, as well as the Congolese province of Haut-Uélé to the south, Maridi State to the east, the Central African region of Haut-Mbomou to the west, and Western Lakes State to the northeast.

Administrative divisions
After the original states split up, Gbudwe State broke down even further for a total of 13 counties in the state. The 13 counties are part of the 180 counties in South Sudan. Also, each county receives a county commissioner. The 13 counties are consisted of the following:

 Former Nzara County:
 Basukangbi
 Nzara
 Sakure
 Former Ezo County:
 Ezo
 Naandi
 Former Nagero County:
 Nagero
 Former Tombura County:
 Mopoi
 Ri-Yubu
 Tombura
 Former Yambio County:
 Bangazagino
 Bangasu
 Yambio

Towns and cities
The capital of Gbudwe State was Yambio, located in Yambio County. The city had an estimated population of around 31,700 in 2011. Other towns and villages in the state include Ezo, Nzara, and Tombura.

References

Equatoria
States of South Sudan